Malini Iyer is an Indian sitcom that aired on Sahara One starring Sridevi. The series is produced Boney Kapoor and directed by Satish Kaushik. The series premiered on 19 January 2004.

Overview
The story revolves round the life of a south Indian Tamil Brahmin girl, Malini Iyer who marries a Punjabi guy, and now how she manages to bring both the cultures together. The problems arises when Malini moves to Punjab with her husband, where she has to follow different culture and rituals altogether. However, she retains her individuality while she loves the family she is married into. As a woman of values and principles, she takes utmost care in following the customs and rituals of both the sides, South and North.

Cast
Sridevi Kapoor as Malini Iyer
Mahesh Thakur as Pankaj Sabharwal
Nasirr Khan as Anthony
Vinay Pathak
Tanushree Kaushal
Kamlesh Oza
Pallavi Dutt
Dilip Joshi

References

Sahara One original programming
Indian comedy television series
Indian television sitcoms
2004 Indian television series debuts
2005 Indian television series endings
Television shows set in Punjab, India
2000s Indian television series